This is a list of notable Hindi horror shows.

See also
 List of Hindi thriller shows
 List of Hindi comedy shows
 List of Bollywood horror films

References

Hindi television content related lists